Viscount Gough, of Goojerat in the Punjab and of the city of Limerick, is a title in the Peerage of the United Kingdom. It was created in 1849 for the military commander Hugh Gough, 1st Baron Gough.

He had already been created a baronet, of Synone and Drangan, in the Baronetage of the United Kingdom, on 23 December 1842, and Baron Gough, of ChingKangFoo in China and of Maharajpore and the Sutlej in the East Indies, in 1849, also in the Peerage of the United Kingdom. Lord Gough later became a field marshal. Currently the titles are held by his great-great-grandson, the fifth Viscount, who succeeded his father in 1951.

The family seat was set down by the 1st Viscount near Gort at Lough Cutra Castle, County Galway, Ireland when purchased by him in 1852.
The family seat presently is Keppoch House, near Dingwall, Ross-shire, Scotland.

Viscounts Gough (1849)
Hugh Gough, 1st Viscount Gough, KP, GCSI, KCB, PC (1779–1869), Field Marshal 
George Gough, 2nd Viscount Gough (1815–1895)
Hugh Gough, 3rd Viscount Gough, KCVO (1849–1919)
Hugh Gough, 4th Viscount Gough, MC (1892–1951)
Shane Gough, 5th Viscount Gough (born 1941)

There is no heir to the titles.

Arms

References

Sources

Kidd, Charles, Williamson, David (editors). Debrett's Peerage and Baronetage (1990 edition). New York: St Martin's Press, 1990, 

Viscountcies in the Peerage of the United Kingdom
Noble titles created in 1849